USS LST-821, renamed USS Harnett County (LST-821/AGP-281), was an  built for the United States Navy during World War II. She was named for Harnett County, North Carolina and was the only U.S. Naval vessel to bear the name. She served the United States Navy in World War II and the Vietnam War. She was transferred to South Vietnam's Republic of Vietnam Navy, which named her RVNS My Tho (HQ-800).

After the Vietnam War, Harnett County was transferred to the Philippine Navy, which named her BRP Sierra Madre (LT-57). In 1999 the Philippine government deliberately had her run aground on Second Thomas Shoal in the Spratly Islands to serve as an outpost of the Philippine Marine Corps to assert Philippine sovereignty in the country's dispute with China over the ownership of the Spratly Islands. To this day, she still serves that function.

US Service history
USS LST-821 was laid down on 19 September 1944 at Evansville, Indiana by the Missouri Valley Bridge & Iron Company. The ship was launched on 27 October 1944, sponsored by Mrs. Hugh Robertson, Sr.. LST-821 was commissioned on 14 November 1944.

During World War II, LST-821 was assigned to the Asiatic-Pacific theater and participated in the assault and occupation of Okinawa Gunto from April through June 1945. Following the War, she performed occupation duty in the Far East until early December 1945. LST-821 returned to the United States and was decommissioned in March 1946 and assigned to the Pacific Reserve Fleet. On 1 July 1955 all remaining LSTs were given names of U.S. counties; LST-821 was named USS Harnett County (LST-821).
 
Recommissioned on 20 August 1966 at the Mare Island Navy Yard, Vallejo, California, Harnett County saw extensive service during the Vietnam War, operating as part of Operation Game Warden, a brown-water navy effort to keep the rivers free of Viet Cong infiltration. Four landing ship tanks were recommissioned to support river patrol operations with the intent of keeping three ships on-station at any one time supporting a River Division of 10 Patrol Boat, River (PBR), a Detachment of two UH-1B helicopter gunships and a SEAL Platoon. The ship not on-station was undergoing ship repairs in the Western Pacific. USS Harnett County reported on-station to CTF 116 on 12 January 1967 and operated as a Patrol Craft Tender (AGP) for the next 43 months on the rivers of the Mekong Delta.

Harnett County participated in the following campaigns: 
 The Vietnamese Counteroffensive – Phase II (12 January to 31 May 1967)
 The Vietnamese Counteroffensive – Phase III (1 June to 12 July 1967 and 17 August 1967 to 29 January 1968)
 The Tet Counteroffensive (30 January to 27 February 1968)
 The Vietnamese Counteroffensive – Phase IV (9 April to 30 June 1968)
 The Vietnamese Counteroffensive – Phase V (1 July to 1 November 1968)
 The Vietnamese Counteroffensive – Phase VI (2 to 4 November 1968 and 8 December 1968 to 22 February 1969)
 The Tet/69 Counteroffensive (23 February to 7 May 1969)
 Vietnam Summer-Fall 1969 (4 August to 31 October 1969)
 Vietnam Winter-Spring 1970 (1 November 1969 to 22 January 1970 and 17 February to 30 April 1970)
 The Sanctuary Counteroffensive (1 May to 30 June 1970)
 The Vietnamese Counteroffensive – Phase VII (1 to 21 July 1970)

She was redesignated a Patrol Craft Tender, USS Harnett County (AGP-821) in the spring of 1970, but then was decommissioned 12 October 1970 at Guam.

LST-821 earned one battle star for World War II service. Additionally, Harnett County earned nine battle stars, two awards of the Presidential Unit Citation, and four awards of the Navy Unit Commendation for the Vietnam War.

RVN and Philippine service history
The US transferred Harnett County to the Republic of South Vietnam under the Security Assistance Program on 12 October 1970 and renamed RVNS My Tho (HQ-800). My Tho was one of the flotilla of thirty-five Republic of Vietnam Navy ships that sailed for Subic Bay after the fall of Saigon in April 1975.

She was transferred to the Philippines on 5 April 1976, which named her BRP Sierra Madre (LT-57).

Involvement in the Spratly Islands dispute
In 1999, the Philippine Navy intentionally ran her aground on the Second Thomas Shoal in order to maintain the Philippine's territorial claim in the area. Since then a detachment of Filipino marines have been continuously stationed on board Sierra Madre to provide a military presence at the site. The Chinese coast guard frequently patrols the area and attempts to prevent the resupply of these Filipino marines. In 2013, The New York Times visited the site and reported on the life of the handful of marines stationed there, and the vessel's role in the geopolitics of the South China Sea. One may infer from the article that Sierra Madre will never sail again, however she has gained importance due to her role as an outpost in the Spratly Islands dispute.

On 11 March 2014, the Philippine government protested to the Chinese chargé d'affaires in Manila that the Chinese Coast Guard had on 9 March prevented two civilian vessels hired by the Philippine Navy from exchanging personnel on, and delivering supplies to, Sierra Madre. This was the first time that Chinese forces had interfered with resupply. On 13 March, the Philippines conducted an aerial resupply mission to the marines. On 1 April 2014, the Philippine Navy succeeded in getting a fishing boat with resupply and replacement marines past the Chinese blockade.

In September 2014, Rupert Wingfield-Hayes, reporting for the BBC, visited Sierra Madre which remained blockaded by the Chinese coastguard. At this time supplies for the garrison of 11 Filipino marines were dropped by air. The ship was described as in a poor condition: "The ship's sides are peppered with massive holes. Waves slosh through them right into the ship's hold."

In July 2015, Philippine Navy spokesman Colonel Edgardo Arevalo said that they are currently doing maintenance repair on the ship to ensure the vessel's minimum habitability.

In November 2021, Chinese Coast Guard ships harassed and blocked two civilian boats resupplying Philippine marines stationed at the Second Thomas Shoal.

Photo gallery

References

 
 

LST-542-class tank landing ships
Ships built in Evansville, Indiana
1944 ships
World War II amphibious warfare vessels of the United States
Cold War amphibious warfare vessels of the United States
Vietnam War amphibious warfare vessels of the United States
Ships transferred from the United States Navy to the Republic of Vietnam Navy
Ships transferred from the United States Navy to the Philippine Navy
Harnett County, North Carolina
LST-542-class tank landing ships of the Philippine Navy